Rowley Habib (24 April 1933 – 3 April 2016), also known as Rore Hapipi, was a New Zealand poet, playwright, and writer of short stories and television scripts.

Biography 
Of Lebanese and Māori descent, Habib identified with the Ngāti Tūwharetoa iwi. He was educated at Te Aute College and then attended teachers' training college for a time, before working in a variety of jobs including in a bookshop, timber mills, freezing works, and on hydroelectric dam construction sites.

He was the first Māori to write an original television drama: his 1979 work The Gathering looked at tensions around an elderly woman's tangihanga. 

He also wrote the play, Death of the Land, in 1976, a courtroom drama which sets in conflict opinions about the proposed sale of a block of Māori ancestral land. This play marks a beginning point for contemporary Māori theatre, the company Te Ika a Maui Players was formed to present it, which they did around the country in community halls, and marae. 

The 1978 television adaptation of the play includes footage of the 1975 Māori Land March and was the first television drama written by a Māori person. Habib's television drama The Protesters won the award for best script at the 1983 New Zealand Feltex Awards. The cast of The Protesters included Merata Mita, Jim Moriarty, Billy T. James and Don Selwyn.

In the field of short story writing, from 1956 to 1971 Habib was a regular contributor to Te Ao Hou / The New World, a magazine for Māori.

In 1984, Habib was awarded the Katherine Mansfield Menton Fellowship, In 2013, Creative New Zealand awarded him a Ngā Tohu a Tā Kingi Ihaka Te Waka Toi Award in recognition of his lifetime of service to Māori arts, describing his play Death of the Land as a "landmark in the development of Māori theatre."

Habib died on 3 April 2016.

Selected works

Television scripts
 1976 – Death of the Land (aired in 1978)
 1979 – The Gathering
 1983 – The Protesters

Poetry
 2006– Poetry anthology, The Raw Men. O-a-Tia Publishers

Plays 

 1976 - The death of the land

References

External links 
 Rowley Habib A New Voice in New Zealand Writing, on National Library of New Zealand website
 List of 13 stories, articles and poems published in Te Ao Hou, on National Library of New Zealand website

1933 births
2016 deaths
Ngāti Tūwharetoa people
New Zealand people of Lebanese descent
People educated at Te Aute College
21st-century New Zealand poets
New Zealand male poets
New Zealand male short story writers
New Zealand Māori writers
21st-century New Zealand male writers